Jitamitra Prasad Singh Deo (born 29 August 1946) is an Indian historian and archaeologist. He is from Khariar, Nuapada, Odisha, India. He is the president of Khariar Sahitya Samiti. He is a famous archaeologist and authors of several books on Odisha. He has discovered of pre-historic rock art of Yogimath Donger, Ghat Ghumar rock art copper plates, gold coins of Sharabhapuriya dynasty, clay seal, stone seal of Panduvamshi dynasty, Kalachuri coins, terracotas, beads and sculpture of various types.

Books
Following are some of his highly cited books:
 Cultural Profile of South Kosala, Gyan books, Delhi, 2012, 
 Origin of Jagannath Deity, Giyan Books, Delhi, 1991, 
 Tantric Art of Odisha
 
 Character Assassination in Modern History of Orissa.

References

External links
 JP Singh Deo

1946 births
Indian art historians
20th-century Indian archaeologists
Scientists from Odisha
Living people
People from Nuapada district
Indian social sciences writers